Elena Vukić (born 10 December 1991) is a Croatian volleyball player. She plays as outside hitter for Croatian club OK Marina Kaštela.

References

External links
Elena Vukić at CEV.eu

1991 births
Living people
Croatian women's volleyball players
Sportspeople from Split, Croatia
Expatriate volleyball players in Slovenia
Mediterranean Games medalists in volleyball
Mediterranean Games gold medalists for Croatia
Competitors at the 2018 Mediterranean Games